"One Girl / One Boy" is a song by American rock band !!!. It was released as the second single from their fifth studio album, Thr!!!er, on April 2, 2013. A music video for the song was also released on May 15. The song peaked at number 87 on the Belgian Flanders Tip chart and was featured on the fictional Radio Mirror Park radio station in the video game Grand Theft Auto V.

Music video
The official music video for "One Girl / One Boy", lasting three minutes and twenty seconds was uploaded onto the band's official YouTube channel on May 15, 2013. The director of the video was credited as Alan Smithee.

Track listing

Digital download
 Warp — WARPDD236B

CD
 Warp — WARPCD236RP

Charts

Release history

References

2013 singles
2013 songs
Warp (record label) singles
!!! songs